The World Database of Happiness is a web-based archive of research findings on subjective appreciation of life. The database contains both an overview of scientific publications on happiness and a digest of research findings. The database contains information on how happy people are in a wide range of circumstances and in 165 different nations. Happiness is defined as the degree to which an individual judges the quality of his or her life as a whole favorably. Two 'components' of happiness are distinguished: hedonic level of affect (the degree to which pleasant affect dominates) and contentment (perceived realization of wants).

Aims
The World Database of Happiness is a tool to quickly acquire an overview on the ever-growing stream of research findings on happiness Medio 2019 the database covered some 30,000 scientific findings, of which about 12,500 are distributional findings (on how happy people are) and another 17,500 correlational findings (on factors associated with more and less happiness). The first findings date from 1915.

Findings
The World Database of Happiness is a ‘findings archive’, which consists of electronic ‘finding pages’ on which separate research results are described in a standard format and terminology. These finding pages can be selected on various characteristics, such as population studies, the measure of happiness used and observed co-variates. All finding-pages have a specific internet address to which links can be made in scientific review papers or policy recommendations. This allows a concise presentation of many findings in a table, while providing readers with access to detail.

Scientific use
The Database has been used in hundreds scientific studies, for example to access under what conditions economic growth enhances average happiness
 or to show that rising mean happiness at first raises happiness inequality, but further rise will diminish these differences, or that healthy eating is associated with more happiness.

Popular use
The World Database of Happiness is often used by popular media to make lists of the happiest countries around the globe. An example is the Happy Planet Index, which aims to chart sustainable happiness all over the world by combining data on longevity, happiness and the size of the ecological footprint of citizens.

Strengths and weaknesses
The database has a clear conceptual focus, it includes only research findings on subjective enjoyment of one's life as a whole. Thereby it evades the Babel that has haunted the study of happiness for ages. The other side of that coin is that much interesting research is left out. The findings are reported with technical details about measurement and statistical analysis. This detail is welcomed by scholars, but makes the information difficult to digest for lay-persons. Still another limitation is that the available findings are often contradictory, which makes it hard to draw firm conclusions about the causes of happiness. What is clear is that poor health, separation, unemployment and lack of social contact are all strongly negatively associated with happiness. Another problem for the World database of happiness is that the number of studies on happiness increases with such a high rate that it gets increasingly difficult to offer a complete overview of all research findings.

A further concern is that the Database of Happiness is exclusively focused on hedonic happiness (feeling good) and not on mature or noetic happiness, that is characterized by a sense of acceptance, inner serenity and being at peace with self, others, and the world. Paul Wong of the INPM put it like this: "The World Database of Happiness does not even include research findings of happiness in suffering. The reality is that all those suffering from a variety of misfortunes—such as poverty, sickness, accidents, or discrimination and oppression—also want to know how they can experience happiness; therefore, psychologists and policymakers need to be concerned about their needs."

References

External links
World database of happiness (http://www1.eur.nl/fsw/happiness/)
Happy Planet Index (http://www.happyplanetindex.org/)

Databases
Happiness